The 2016 Critérium International was the 85th edition of the Critérium International cycling stage race. It took place on the island of Corsica, around the city of Porto Vecchio. As the previous three editions, the race consisted of three stages, two on the first race day (including a short individual time trial) and one on the second day. Thibaut Pinot of  won the race and two stages, including his first ever win in an individual time trial. The race was overshadowed by the death of Belgian cyclist Daan Myngheer, who suffered a heart attack during the opening stage of the race and was taken to hospital, where he died.

Schedule

Teams
A total of 16 teams were selected to take part in the race:

Stages

Stage 1
26 March (Morning)  Porto-Vecchio – Porto-Vecchio,

Stage 2
26 March (Afternoon)  Porto-Vecchio – Porto-Vecchio,

Stage 3
27 March Porto-Vecchio – Col de l'Ospedale,

Classification leadership table

 In stage two, Romain Feillu, who was third in the points classification, wore the green jersey, because Sam Bennett, the leader of the classification wore the yellow jersey as leader of the general classification and Rudy Barbier, who was second in the points classification, wore the white jersey as leader of the young riders' classification.
 In stage three, Sam Bennett, who was second in the points classification, wore the green jersey, because Thibaut Pinot, the leader of the classification wore the yellow jersey as leader of the general classification.

References

External links

Criterium International
Criterium International
Critérium International